Ana Paula de la Peña (born 25 July 1988) is a Mexican professional tennis player and member of the Mexico Fed Cup team.

On February 13, 2012, she reached her highest WTA singles ranking of No. 395 whilst her best doubles ranking was No. 489 on 12 December 2011.

Career statistics

Doubles finals: 2 (2–0)

References

External links
 
 
 

1988 births
Living people
Sportspeople from Durango
Mexican female tennis players
Tennis players at the 2011 Pan American Games
Pan American Games medalists in tennis
Pan American Games gold medalists for Mexico
Medalists at the 2011 Pan American Games
21st-century Mexican women